Schradera campii is a species of flowering plant in the family Rubiaceae. It is endemic to Ecuador.

References

Flora of Ecuador
campii
Vulnerable plants
Taxonomy articles created by Polbot